St. Anthony's Group (St. Anthony's) is a Sri Lankan conglomerate company headquartered in Colombo, Sri Lanka. St. Anthony's Group owns businesses across Sri Lanka engaged in hardware, textiles, roofing, media, construction, hospitality, farms, manufacturing, retail, solar and hydropower.

References

External links
 St. Anthony’s Industries Group
 St. Anthony’s Hardware

1942 establishments in Ceylon
Conglomerate companies of Sri Lanka
Holding companies of Sri Lanka